Willy Marshall is an American Libertarian politician and became the first openly gay mayor in Utah when he was elected in 2001 to serve as the mayor of the town of Big Water, Utah.

In keeping with his libertarian principles, Marshall repealed his municipal salary. He also cut municipal taxes by 50 percent and attempted to decriminalize marijuana. The county government prevented full implementation of the decriminalization.

Marshall campaigned unsuccessfully from 1982 to 1996 for election to serve as a member of the Utah House of Representatives, the Utah Senate and the U.S. House of Representatives before his mayoral campaign in 2000.

Notes

External links
 Big Water, Utah 
 Utah Libertarian Party

Gay politicians
LGBT mayors of places in the United States
LGBT people from Utah
Living people
Mayors of places in Utah
People from Kane County, Utah
Utah Libertarians
Year of birth missing (living people)